The Monastery of the Holy Trinity (also known as Agia Triada, Ayías Triádhos, Ayia Triada; all meaning "Holy Trinity") is an Eastern Orthodox monastery in central Greece, situated in the Peneas Valley northeast of the town of Kalambaka. It is situated at the top of a rocky precipice over 400 metres high and forms part of 24 monasteries which were originally built at Meteora, one of the oldest still existing of the Meteora monasteries (Meteora means "suspended in the air" in Greek). Six of the 24 monasteries are still active and open to visitors. The church was constructed between the fourteenth and fifteenth centuries and is included in the UNESCO list of World Heritage Sites titled Meteora.

Geography

The monasteries were built on rock cliffs in the deltaic plains of Meteora. They are situated in the Pineios Valley within the Thessalian plains close to the town of Kalambaka. The rock cliffs, dated by chemical analysis to be 60 million years old, were created during earthquakes, and are of sandstone and conglomerate formations caused by fluvial erosion. The sediments were once in an inland sea during the Pliocene epoch. They rose as a cone during the earthquakes, forming steep rock columns, known as "heavenly columns". The area is hilly and forested, with river valleys, and a protected area known as Trikala Aesthetic Forest.

The monasteries of St. Stephen and Holy Trinity are separated from the main group, which are further to the north. Prior to the twentieth century, Holy Trinity had a very difficult approach, requiring crossing a valley and climbing through the rock outcrop to reach the building's entrance. Provisions were placed in baskets drawn up by rope-ladders (now with a winch). In present day, one can walk from Kalambaka for  along a foot track to reach the monastery, or use a winch-operated lift. There is a road from the back side of the cliff. It is currently reached via tunnels and 130 steps of stone. The grounds include a  garden at the summit.

To the northeast, there is a chapel (Ιερός Ναός Αγίου Αθανασίου) dedicated to St. Athanasius of Tzertzi (Άγιος Αθανάσιος Τζέρτζης).

History

The history of building monasteries on top of perilous cliffs near Meteora occurred between the 14th and 15th centuries. Even prior to this, in the 11th century, religious communities had established hermitages at the foot of these cliffs. In the 14th century, the titular emperor of Serbs and Greeks, John Uroš, became a monk and moved to Meteora; he endowed, rebuilt and established monasteries here. During the political upheavals in the region during this century, monks retreated to the safe haven offered by the cliffs. Dometius was said to be the first monk at the site of Holy Trinity, arriving according to local legend, in 1438. Holy Trinity according to many sources was built in 1475–76, though some sources say the construction dates of the monastery and its adjoining chapel, dedicated to St. John the Baptist, are unknown. Holy Trinity's decoration was added in 1741. By end of the fifteenth century, there were 24 such monasteries, such as Holy Trinity, St. Barbara Rousanou, and St. Nicholas Anapafsas. Damascene, Jonah, and Parthenios, were benefactors and those who took part in restorations; their names grace the monastery walls.

Only six of the original monasteries are still occupied, including Holy Trinity. These six – Holy Trinity, St. Stephen, Rousanou, St. Nicholas Anapafsas, Varlaam, and the Great Meteoron – make up the UNESCO World Heritage Site entitled Meteora. The UNESCO inscribing was done under criteria in 1988. I, II, IV, V and VII.

Architecture and fittings 

The church plan is in the form of a cruciform type and has a dome which is supported on two columns. The monastery's main cathedral was constructed in the 15th century and decorated with frescoes in 1741 by two monks. A pseudo-trefoil window is part of the apse. There are white columns and arches, as well as rose-coloured tiles. A small skeuophylakion adjoining the church was built in 1684. Its broad esonarthex barrel vault was built in 1689 and embellished in 1692. The small chapel of St. John the Baptist, carved into the rock, contains frescoes from the seventeenth century. It was richly decorated and had precious manuscripts; however, these treasures were looted during World War II, when it was occupied by the Germans. The building's sixteenth-century frescoes are reported to be post-Byzantine paintings. A fresco of St Sisois and the skeleton of Alexander the Great adorns the walls.

Monastic life

At one time, fifty monks lived at Holy Trinity, but by the early twentieth century, there were only five. Visitors are allowed. Patrick Leigh Fermor is reported to have visited the monasteries here several decades ago, as a guest of the Abbot of Varlaam. Even then, Holy Trinity was one of the poorest monasteries in Meteora.

In popular culture 

The monastery was featured in the 1981 James Bond film For Your Eyes Only. It features in the climax to the film where Bond ascends the rock cliff and intrudes upon Aristotle Kristatos and Erich Kriegler to retrieve the ATAC decoder. Aristotle Kristatos, played by Julian Glover, was using the monastery in the film as a hideout. Eventually Bond throws the ATAC decoder off the cliff top when approached by the KGB.

The Monastery also features in the 1961 film Tintin and the Golden Fleece.

The 1957 film Boy on a Dolphin is partly shot in Meteora. Clifton Webb's character visits Meteora, and goes up to the Holy Trinity monastery to do some library research.

References

Religious buildings and structures completed in 1476
Holy Trinity
Christian monasteries established in the 15th century
1476 establishments in Europe
Archbishopric of Ohrid